Red Bull is a brand of energy drinks.

Red Bull may also refer to:

 Red Bull (fictional creature), from the fantasy novel The Last Unicorn and its film adaptation by Peter S. Beagle
 Red bull ant, a species of ant found in Australia
 Red Bull Culture Clash, a sound clash competition
 Red Bull GmbH, the private company owner of the brand
 Red Bull Highway (Minnesota), a section of Interstate 35 in Minnesota, US
 Red Bull Highway (Iowa), a section of U.S. Route 34 in Iowa, US
 Red Bull Theatre, a seventeenth century playhouse in London
 Red Bull, a Schlitz malt liquor
 Red Bulls, nickname for the 34th Infantry Division of the US Army

Sport
 Red Bull Racing, a Formula One team
 Red Bull Ring, a racing circuit in Austria
 RB Leipzig, German football club nicknamed the Red Bulls
 Red Bulls (esports), a League of Legends videogame professional gaming team
 New York Red Bulls, a soccer team

See also

 Red Bullock (1911–1988), American baseball player
 Red Bullet (born 1997), American racehorse 
 Krating Daeng, the original Thai drink that became Red Bull
 
 
 Red Bull Racing (disambiguation)
 Red Bull Salzburg (disambiguation)